Pierce Township is an inactive township in Lawrence County, in the U.S. state of Missouri.

Pierce Township was named after the community of Pierce City, Missouri.

References

Townships in Missouri
Townships in Lawrence County, Missouri